Zanthoxylum acanthopodium, or andaliman, is a species of flowering plant in the family Rutaceae. Its range includes southern western China (Guangxi, Guizhou, Sichuan, Tibet, and Yunnan), Bangladesh, Bhutan, northern India and northeastern India (Arunachal Pradesh, Assam, Manipur, Meghalaya, Mizoram, Nagaland, Sikkim, Uttar Pradesh, and West Bengal), Nepal, Laos, Burma, northern Thailand, Vietnam, Indonesia (northern Sumatran highlands), and Peninsular Malaysia.

Much like the closely related Sichuan pepper (Z. piperitum), the seed pericarps are used as spices in cooking and have a similar tongue-numbing characteristic. However, in cooking, the flavour of andaliman has lemon-like notes (similar to those of lemon-grass) as well as a hint of the aromatic pandan leaf.

References

acanthopodium
Plants described in 1824
Spices
Indonesian cuisine
Flora of the Indian subcontinent
Flora of Guangxi
Flora of Guizhou
Flora of Indo-China
Flora of Peninsular Malaysia
Flora of Sumatra
Flora of Tibet
Flora of Yunnan